Greg Adams may refer to:

Greg Adams (ice hockey, born 1963), retired NHL player for the Vancouver Canucks
Greg Adams (ice hockey, born 1960), retired NHL player for the Washington Capitals
Greg Adams (writer) (born 1970), American music writer and reissue producer
Greg Adams (musician), trumpet player formerly with Tower of Power
Greg Adams (singer) (1948–2008), Canadian singer with a record produced by Jimmy Johnson
Greg L. Adams (born 1952), Nebraska legislator
Greg Adams (glassblower)  (born 1974)

See also
Adams (surname)